The Big Rimu Walk is a nature trail near Karamea, located in Kahurangi National Park on the West Coast of the South Island of New Zealand. Other smaller rimu in the area were logged during the 1940s but this large tree was left.

The regenerating forest is dominated by kāmahi and nīkau, but there are also small rimu trees emerging. The large rimu itself has a northern rātā vine on the trunk, with extensive rātā foliage in the canopy. The tree hosts a large collection of epiphytes. One notable feature of the track to the large rimu is the presence of Dawsonia—a giant moss—growing alongside the track.

References

External links

 Video clip - Big Rimu Tree Walk - Karamea, New Zealand
 Walks in the Karamea Area, Kahurangi National Park at the Department of Conservation

Kahurangi National Park
Buller District
Hiking and tramping tracks in the West Coast, New Zealand